Admiral James may refer to:

Jules James (1885–1957), U.S. Navy vice admiral
Ralph K. James (1906–1994), U.S. Navy rear admiral
William James (Royal Navy officer, born 1881) (died 1973), British Royal Navy admiral